Françoise Cloarec (born 1957 in Paris) is a French writer, painter and psychoanalyst.

Works 
1998:  Bîmâristâns, lieux de folie et de sagesse, L'Harmattan, Paris
2000: Syrie, un voyage en soi, L'Harmattan
2002: Le Caravansérail, L’Harmattan, 206 p. 
2003: Le Temps des consuls. L’Échelle d’Alep sous les Ottomans, L’Harmattan, 171 p.  , 147 p. 
2008: Séraphine. La Vie rêvée de Séraphine de Senlis, Paris, Éditions Phébus, 172 p. .
2010: Storr. Architecte de l’ailleurs, Éditions Phébus, 170 p. 
2010: Quand la mer peint, photos by Monique Pietri, Libourne, France, La part des anges éditions, 59 p. 
2013: L’Âme du savon d’Alep, photos by Marc Lavaud, Paris, Éditions Noir sur Blanc, 200 p. 
2014: De père légalement inconnu, Éditions Phébus, 148 p. 
2016: L’Indolente. Le Mystère Marthe Bonnard, Paris, Stock, series "La Bleue", 352 p.

References

External links 
 Official website
 Françoise Cloarec on France Inter
 Françoise Cloarec - L'indolente on YouTube
 L'Indolente on Babelio
 Françoise Cloarec's paintings

21st-century French women writers
21st-century French novelists
21st-century French essayists
1957 births
Writers from Paris
Living people
20th-century French novelists
20th-century French women writers